Tanya Moore is an activist for women in science.

Background
Moore obtained a B.S. in Mathematics at Spelman College, MSE in Mathematical Sciences at Johns Hopkins University and a Ph.D. in Biostatistics at UC Berkeley in 2002.

Moore founded Infinite Possibilities Conference in 2005, a national conference that is designed to promote, educate, encourage and support minority women underrepresented in mathematics and statistics. Moore is the lead on the 2020 Vision Projects in Berkeley, which aims to close the achievement gap between white, black, and Latino students. Moore sits on the board of directors for Building Diversity in STEM, a non-profit designed to empower and support underrepresented groups students in the pursuit of STEM careers.

In 2011, Moore was identified as one of the 5 top Black women in STEM, and nominated for Black History Month 2018 Honoree by The Network of Minorities in Mathematical Sciences. Moore was featured in Essence Magazine's 15 Black Women Who Are Paving The Way In STEM And Breaking Barriers and The Oprah Magazine's 3 science rock stars and was recognized as “STEM Woman of the Year” by California State Assembly Member Nancy Skinner

References

Spelman College alumni
Johns Hopkins University alumni
University of California, Berkeley alumni
African-American people
Living people
Science communication
Year of birth missing (living people)